The Legislature III of Italy was the 3rd legislature of the Italian Republic, and lasted from 12 June 1958 until 15 May 1963. Its composition was the one resulting from the general election of 25 May 1958.

Main chronology
In the 1958 general election, Amintore Fanfani, as secretary of the Christian Democrats, run as the main candidate to become the next Prime Minister. The electoral result was similar to the one of five years before. Christian Democracy (DC) gained 42.4% of votes, nearly doubling Palmiro Togliatti's Communist Party, which arrived second. However, the poor results of the other small centrist and secular parties kept the same problems of political instability within the centrist coalition, which characterised the previous legislature.

Christian Democracy resulted even more polarized between Fanfani's leftist faction and the opposite one which urged for a rightist policy; Fanfani relaunched his reformist agenda, advocating for a dialogue with the Italian Socialist Party (PSI), which had stopped its ties with the communists after the Hungarian Revolution. However, a government between DC and PSI was too premature due to the strong opposition of DC's right-wing, so, on 1 July 1958, Fanfani sworn in as new Prime Minister at the head of a coalition government with the Italian Democratic Socialist Party (PSDI), and a case-by-case support of the Italian Republican Party (PRI).

The unprecedented concentration of power that Fanfani had achieved within this party was the main reason of his second government's decline. The outrageous conservative opposition resulted in a progressive breakdown of the internal majority faction, "Democratic Initiative". In January 1959, a conspicuous group of Christian Democrats started voting against their own government, forcing Fanfani to resign on 26 January 1959, after only six months in power.

On 16 February 1959, Antonio Segni, member of the right-wing faction of the party, sworn in as new Prime Minister. Segni formed a one-party government, composed only by members of the Christian Democracy, which was externally supported by minor centre-right and right-wing parties, included the neo-fascist Italian Social Movement (MSI). However, in March 1960, the Italian Liberal Party (PLI) withdrew its support to the government and Segni was forced to resign.

President Giovanni Gronchi then gave Fernando Tambroni the task of forming a new cabinet. Tambroni formed a one-party cabinet composed only by DC members, with the sole external support of the neo-fascist Italian Social Movement (MSI), a unique case in the history of the Italian Republic. On 8 April, the Chamber of Deputies gave the confidence vote to government, with the fundamental support of the MSI. However, the neo-fascist vital support created growing tensions within the DC and with some ministers who threatened their resignations, Tambroni was forced to resign. President Gronchi gave then the task of forming a new cabinet to Fanfani, to verify the possibility of starting a centre-left government. However, he was opposed by an important part of the DC, so Tambroni returned to the Senate, where he received the confidence vote on 29 April.

Tambroni listed among the main focus of his government's program the institution of regions with a special statute for Friuli-Venezia Giulia, the reform of local finances, the modernization of public administration, a wide program of social and economic interventions, the reorganization of the state railways and a new foreign policy to improve bilateral relations with emerging countries like China, India and Arab countries. However, the most controversial decision of his cabinet, was the permission to the MSI to hold its national congress in Genoa, one of the capitals of Italian Resistance against Fascism. This move was considered by the public opinion as a further and unacceptable opening to the neo-fascists, by the government.

On 30 June 1960, a large demonstration summoned by the left-wing CGIL trade union and by other leftist forces in the streets of Genoa was heavily suppressed by the Italian police. Other popular demonstrations in Reggio Emilia, Rome, Palermo, Catania, Licata again saw violent intervention by the police, causing several deaths. On 7 July, while news of the demonstrators killed in Reggio Emilia arrived in the Chamber, Tambroni only spoke about "unpleasant incidents", stating the government's willingness was to do "its duty to defend the state and the free institutions". Moreover, the interior minister, Giuseppe Spataro, accused the PCI of having stirred up the riots.

On 8 July, the political situation was so worrying that the President of the Senate, Cesare Merzagora, with an unprecedented practice and not informing the President of the Republic, proposed, finding support also in the President of the Chamber Giovanni Leone, a fifteen-day truce, with the return of the police  to the barracks and the consequent stop of anti-fascist protests. This effectively delegitimized the actions of Tambroni and Spataro, and represented the beginning of the government crisis. On 19 July, when many members of his own party, withdrew their supports to the government, Tambroni was forced to resign, after only 116 days in power.

President Gronchi then decided to ask again Amintore Fanfani to forma new government. Fanfani's third government officially sworn in in July 1960 and was formed only by DC ministers. The cabinet was externally supported by PSDI, PRI and PLI. With Fanfani as Prime Minister and Aldo Moro as Secretary of the party, the so-called Organic Centre-left period was ready to begin.

In February 1962, after the national congress of the Christian Democracy, Fanfani reorganised his cabinet and gained the benign abstention of the socialist leader Pietro Nenni. During this term as Prime Minister Fanfani carried out a number of reforms in areas such as health, education, and social security. On 8 April 1962 the cabinet introduced broad provisions covering building areas. Local governments were obliged to provide plans of areas suitable for economic housing, while strict price controls for building areas were introduced to prevent speculation.

On 31 December 1962, the Parliament approved a law that extended compulsory education to the age of 14 and introduced a single unified curriculum, lasting for a 3-year period after primary education. On 12 August 1962, Fanfani introduced a supplementary pension payment, equal to one-twelfth of the annual amount of pension minima, while also introducing child supplements for pensioners. Moreover, on 5 March 1963, he introduced a voluntary pension insurance scheme for housewives. On 19 January 1963, the government proposed a bill that extended the insurance against occupational diseases to artisans, while general improvements to cash benefits were carried out: all pensions were to be adjusted every third year to the minimum contractual wage in the respective industrial sector, while earnings-replacement rates were raised to correspond to contractual disability rates. In February 1963, improved health benefits for agricultural workers, with the introduction of free pharmaceutical assistance and the flat-rate sickness indemnity replaced by an earnings-related indemnity equal to 50% of minimum contractual pay (in each province) for a maximum of 180 days.

In his three years rule, thanks to the key support of the PSI, Fanfani approved the nationalization of Enel, the national electric company and the establishment of middle school, the introduction of share taxation. Only the implementation of the ordinary statute regions and the urban reform remained uncompleted, due to a strong internal opposition within the DC. Moreover, the new international balance of power marked by the presidency of John F. Kennedy, influenced Western politics in favor of reformism, as the best alternative to defeat communism.

Presidential election
On 2 May 1962 the Parliament met to elect the third President of Italy. On 6 May 1962 the Christian democrat Antonio Segni was elected on the ninth ballot with 443 votes out of 854.

Government

Fanfani II Cabinet

Segni II Cabinet

Tambroni Cabinet

Fafani III Cabinet

Fanfani IV Cabinet

Parliamentary composition

Chamber of Deputies

 President: Giovanni Leone (DC), elected on 12 June 1958
 Vice Presidents: Brunetto Bucciarelli-Ducci (DC), Paolo Rossi (PSDI), Girolamo Li Causi (PCI), Ferdinando Targetti (PSI)

Senate of the Republic

 President: Cesare Merzagora (Ind), elected on 12 June 1958
 Vice Presidents: Stanislao Ceschi (DC), Giacinto Bosco (DC, until 25 July 1960), Mauro Scoccimarro (PCI), Ettore Tibaldi (PSI), Ennio Zelioli-Lanzini (DC, from 12 October 1960)

Senators for Life

References

Legislatures of Italy
1958 establishments in Italy
1963 disestablishments in Italy